The Alabaster Staff is a fantasy novel by Edward Bolme, set in the Forgotten Realms fictional universe. It is the first novel in "The Rogues" series.

Plot summary
A young street performer is drawn into a twisting plot of double-crossings and betrayals, at the center of which is the artifact of great power known as the Alabaster Staff.

Reception 
In a moderately positive review, critic Don D'Ammassa wrote that the main character "is a reasonably well developed character and her exploits are fast paced and enthusiastically described."

Publication history
2003, USA, Wizards of the Coast , Pub date 1 July 2003, Paperback.

References 

2003 American novels
American fantasy novels
Forgotten Realms novels